Parguera is a barrio in the municipality of Lajas, Puerto Rico with a population of 2,082 in 2010. La Parguera is the main settlement of the barrio, often referred to as Poblado de la Parguera. Parguera is home to La Parguera Nature Reserve, which encompasses the bioluminescent bay, its surrounding mangrove forests, wetlands and a number of keys such as Mata La Gata and Cayo Enrique. The name Parguera derives from pargo, the local name for the Northern red snapper (Lutjanus campechanus).

History
The settlement of La Parguera was established as a villa pesquera (fishing village) in 1825.

Puerto Rico was ceded by Spain in the aftermath of the Spanish–American War under the terms of the Treaty of Paris of 1898 and became an unincorporated territory of the United States. In 1899, the United States Department of War conducted a census of Puerto Rico finding that the combined population of Parguera and Costa barrios was 1,256.

Features
Parguera barrio is mainly known for  Bio Bay, a tourist spot from where sunset and night bioluminescent tours leave regularly. Tourists go out on a kayak or small boat at night to see the bay with its bioluminescent waters, caused by microorganisms called dinoflagellate and seen when the water is disturbed at night. A  (country inn) called Parador Villa Parguera is located in Parguera.

Gallery

See also

 List of communities in Puerto Rico

References

Barrios of Lajas, Puerto Rico